Upper and Lower Ogden Reservoirs are half a mile to the west of the village of Barley, in the Borough of Pendle, England. They supply drinking water to the town of Nelson.

Three forests covering more than  can be found close to the reservoirs. Fell Wood, which is the largest, was planted in 1931 and contains Norway Spruce (Picea abies), Sitka Spruce (Picea sitchensis), Scots Pine (Pinus sylvestris) and European Larch (Larix decidua). Blue Wood, which was originally planted in 1935 with Scots Pine, Sitka Spruce and Larch was felled and replanted in 1981. The third forest: Buttock Plantation, was planted in 1935 with Sitka Spruce and Larch.

References 

Drinking water reservoirs in England
Reservoirs in Lancashire
Geography of the Borough of Pendle